Prosomicrocotylinae is a subfamily within  family Microcotylidae and class Monogenea. 
Members of Prosomicrocotylinae are characterized by their haptor divided into two separate marginal frills, each of which extends along lateral margin of body proper.

Species
According to the World Register of Marine Species, this subfamily includes one genus:

References

Microcotylidae
Protostome subfamilies